Shipwrecked is a 1926 American silent romantic adventure film directed by Joseph Henabery and starring Seena Owen and Joseph Schildkraut. It is based on the play Shipwrecked by Langdon McCormick and was released through Producers Distributing Corporation.

Cast

Preservation
Shipwrecked is preserved at the Library of Congress at its Packard Campus.

See also
Beyond (1921)
Cast Away (2000)

References

External links

Lantern slide

1926 films
American silent feature films
Films directed by Joseph Henabery
American films based on plays
1926 romantic drama films
American romantic drama films
American black-and-white films
Producers Distributing Corporation films
American adventure films
1926 adventure films
1920s American films
Silent romantic drama films
Silent adventure films
Silent American drama films